Nemali is a village in NTR district of the Indian state of Andhra Pradesh. It is located in Gampalagudem mandal of Tiruvuru revenue division.
The word Nemali means "peacock" in Telugu.

Demographics 

 Census of India, Nemali had a total population of 2,867 of which 1,481 were male and 1,386 female —a sex ratio of 936 females per 1000 males. There were 287 children in the 0–6 year age group of which 143 were boys and 144 girls. The average literacy rate stands at 62.29% with 1,607 literates, higher than the district average of 73.70%.

Government and politics 

Nemali falls under the administration of Gampalagudem mandal and is represented by the Tiruvuru Assembly constituency, which in turn represents Andhra Pradesh's Vijayawada Lok Sabha constituency.  the MLA representing the constituency is Kokkiligadda Rakshana Nidhi of the YSR Congress Party.

Notable personalities 

Nemali is hometown of famous modern times poet Dr Rallabhandi Kavitha Prasad (late) who served as director, Dept of Culture, Govt of Andhra Pradesh and also worked as secretary of Dharma Prachara Parishad (DPP), in TTD, Tirupati. Kavita Prasad was the author of several books. He penned the books  'Avadhana Vidya - Arambha Vikasalu', 'Padyamandapam', 'Agnihimsa', 'Idi Kavisamayam', 'Saptagiridhama Kaliyuga Sarvabhouma'.

References 

Villages in NTR district